The Urșița is a right tributary of the river Stavnic in Romania. It flows into the Stavnic in Cioca-Boca.

References

Rivers of Romania
Rivers of Iași County